Teenage Mutant Ninja Turtles, known as  in Japan and Teenage Mutant Hero Turtles in Europe, is a 1989 side-scrolling action-platform game for the Nintendo Entertainment System released by Konami.  In North America it was published under Konami's Ultra Games imprint in the US and the equivalent PALCOM brand in Europe and Australia.

Alongside the arcade game (also developed by Konami), it was one of the first video games based on the 1987 Teenage Mutant Ninja Turtles animated series, being released after the show's second season. The game sold more than  cartridges worldwide.

Plot
Shredder kidnaps April and gains the Life Transformer Gun, a weapon capable of returning Splinter  to his human form. In order to save April, the turtles (Leo,   Mikey, Donny and Raph) embark on the streets of New York to confront the Foot Clan. While traversing the sewers, the turtles encounter Bebop, a mutated pig, and Rocksteady, a mutant rhino. Though the turtles defeat Bebop, Rocksteady escapes with April O’Neil. The turtles then chase Rocksteady to an abandoned warehouse, fight him, and rescue April. After disabling bombs in the Hudson River dam, Shredder captures Splinter, so the turtles give chase in the Party Wagon. Hot in pursuit, the turtles scour the city and eventually find that Splinter is held captive by the robotic Mecaturtle on a skyscraper rooftop.  After the turtles save Splinter, Shredder escapes in a helicopter.  The turtles give chase, tracking him to JFK airport, where they encounter Big Mouser. After defeating Big Mouser, the turtles head to Shredder's secret Foot Clan base in the South Bronx via the Turtle Blimp.  Once there, they locate and battle the Technodrome underground. The turtles descend into the Technodrome’s reactor and ultimately defeat Shredder. With the Life Transformer Gun, the turtles help Splinter return to his human form. With a tough mission accomplished, the turtles and April celebrate with a pizza.

Gameplay

Teenage Mutant Ninja Turtles is a single-player action game. The player starts the game as Leonardo, but can switch to any of the other turtles by pressing the start button and accessing the information screen. The information screen shows each turtle's health, special weapons, a map grid of the current area, and messages from either Splinter or April. Each primary weapon has a different speed, power, and reach.  Thus, during gameplay, certain turtles may be more adept at defeating certain enemies and navigating particular obstacles than others. When a turtle runs out of health, falls into a fatal trap, or is struck by a roller car, the Foot Clan captures the turtle and holds him in an undisclosed location.  This forces the player to choose one of the remaining turtles in order to continue. The player loses the game when all four turtles are captured. From stage three onward, a captured turtle may be rescued once per each area of gameplay. Overall, six stages (missions) comprise the game: 1) Streets of New York 2) Hudson River Dam 3) Wall Street Rooftops 4) JFK Airport 5) South Bronx Lair 6) Technodrome.

Initially, a player navigates the mission map in an overhead view.  When a turtle enters a sewer or building interior, gameplay switches to a side-scrolling perspective.  While in the overhead view, a player can move in four cardinal directions and use primary weapons for a single type of attack. As the game progresses, more lethal and numerous enemies appear.  In later stages, obstacles include gaps that involve well-timed jumps and inaccessible areas that require specialty items, such as ropes, to progress across building rooftops.

In side-scrolling portions of the game, the turtles jump, crouch, and attack with primary or alternate weapons. Alternate weapons are occasionally dropped by enemies or found along the way in limited quantities.  These weapons include single shurikens (throwing stars), triple shurikens (launches three stars simultaneously in a spreading pattern) and boomerangs. A powerful "Kiai" weapon, a scroll that expands into a crescent-shaped beam, may be found in later stages. A limited number of invincibility icons also appear throughout the game, which grant a temporary "cannonball" invincibility effect and allows a turtle to bulldoze their way through enemies and obstacles.  On a side note, boomerangs can be reused if the player catches them upon return.  Lastly, if a turtle acquires a new weapon, it will replace the previous alternate weapon.

As the game progresses, the turtles must defeat various enemies, navigate traps, search for specific items, and complete certain tasks, such as defusing timed bombs in the underwater area of stage two. During gameplay, the turtles collect pizza to replenish health.  The amount of health restored is dependent on pizza portions (whole, half, or slice).  A player is given a limited number of continue options.  Boss confrontations include Bebop (stage one mid-boss), Rocksteady (stage one boss), Mecaturtle (stage three), Big Mouser (stage four), the Technodrome (stage five), and Shredder.

Releases

Regional differences
The game was released for the Family Computer (Famicom) in Japan a few months earlier than the American NES version under the title . This was the first TMNT product released in the country, predating the Japanese dub of both the first film and the animated series. Subsequent TMNT video games released in Japan kept the franchise's original title. While graphics and gameplay are virtually identical to its NES counterpart, the Japanese localization changed the plot a bit by turning April O'Neil from an acquaintance of the Turtles into Splinter's daughter.

The game was released as Teenage Mutant Hero Turtles in all European territories, in line with the renaming of the first cartoon series in those territories.

Ports
The game was ported to various home computer platforms in 1990. Konami, under the Ultra Games label, released DOS, Commodore 64, and Amiga versions in North America, while the game was licensed to Mirrorsoft's Image Works label for the European market, where DOS, Commodore 64, Amiga, ZX Spectrum, Atari ST, and MSX versions were released. The European Amiga port is different than the North American version. The initial release of the DOS version contains a programming error that creates a gap that is impossible to cross without cheating or a patch. The game was the UK's number 1 selling Spectrum game for 6 months between March and August 1991.

It was released in 2007 on the Wii's Virtual Console. It was released for the Wii in Europe and Australia for 500 points which was later raised to 600 Wii Points. In North America, it was released for Wii on April 2, 2007, for the price of 600 points—100 points more than the average NES game—due to a licensing issue. It was the first licensed game to appear on the North American and European Virtual Console. Due to licensing issues, it was later removed from the Wii Shop Channel in Japan on January 24, 2012, and in North America and Europe on January 26, 2012.

The NES version of the game was re-released as part of Teenage Mutant Ninja Turtles: The Cowabunga Collection in 2022.

Reception

The game was a commercial success. By May 1990, it had sold over  cartridges in the United States. By the end of 1990, the game had sold more than  cartridges worldwide, earning  ( adjusted for inflation) for Konami.

However, it received a mixed critical reception upon its original NES release. Nintendo Power scored it 4 out of 5 and praised its "superb play control" and "super-sharp graphics", whereas Electronic Gaming Monthlys panel of four reviewers scored it 6, 7, 6 and 4 out of 10, the latter describing it as a "disappointment."

The ZX Spectrum port was reviewed more positively. Your Sinclair gave the game a 90% rating, praising the game's colorful, cartoonish graphics and move sets while also criticizing the game's swimming level.

When the NES game was re-released on Virtual Console in 2007, it attracted largely negative reviews. GameSpot's Frank Provo gave Teenage Mutant Ninja Turtles 2.7 out of 10, citing the game's very hard difficulty and the game's unpolished and unfun nature as reasons for the rating. Provo also stated that, while the game's music is upbeat, the music and the game in general lacks the more recognizable traits of the Teenage Mutant Ninja Turtles franchise.  Mark Birnbaum of IGN gave Teenage Mutant Ninja Turtles a 5.5 out of 10 pointing out that the game is dated and only for nostalgic and hardcore fans. Birnbaum stated that the controls were poor, the enemies bland and the level design and characters were negatives in the game. Both reviewers also cited its poor quality in comparison to Konami's later Turtles NES games, which were not re-released.

Notes

References

External links
 

1989 video games
Nintendo Entertainment System games
Platform games
PlayChoice-10 games
Konami games
Commodore 64 games
Amiga games
Amstrad CPC games
Atari ST games
ZX Spectrum games
Video games based on Teenage Mutant Ninja Turtles
Video games scored by Jeroen Tel
Video games set in New York City
Virtual Console games
MSX games
DOS games
Single-player video games
Ultra Games video games
U.S. Gold games
Video games developed in Japan